John Royster "Roy" Thurman III (April 11, 1924 – April 24, 2004) was a United States Army lieutenant general.

Education
Thurman was a 1946 graduate of the United States Military Academy. He was also a graduate of the Armed Forces Staff College (1960), the Naval War College (1965), and Harvard University's six-week Advanced Management Program (1969). George Washington University awarded Thurman a Master of Science in international affairs.

Military career
Before attending West Point he served as an enlisted man in the United States Army from 1942 to 1943.

Thurman held commands during both the Korean War and the Vietnam War. He last served as Deputy Commanding General, Army Training and Doctrine before retiring in 1979 after 32 years of service. Roy Thurman was the older brother of General Maxwell Reid Thurman. Thurman's remains are interred at Arlington National Cemetery.

Awards
Thurman's military awards and honors include the Army Distinguished Service Medal, the Legion of Merit with five Oak Leaf Clusters, the Distinguished Flying Cross with one Oak leaf Cluster, a Bronze Star Medal with Valor Device and four Oak Leaf Clusters, the Air Medal with 34 oak leaf clusters, the Army Commendation Medal, the Purple Heart, the Combat Infantryman Badge, and a Master Parachutist Badge.

References

1924 births
2004 deaths
United States Army generals
United States Army personnel of the Korean War
United States Army personnel of the Vietnam War
Recipients of the Distinguished Service Medal (US Army)
Recipients of the Legion of Merit
Burials at Arlington National Cemetery
Military personnel from Lexington, Kentucky
Elliott School of International Affairs alumni
United States Military Academy alumni